Pingtan is a town in Tongliang District, Chongqing, China. , it administers Longtan Residential Community and the following 17 villages: 
Wanqiao Village
Yanghai Village
Huaguang Village
Xinhua Village
Chala Village
Qinggang Village
Zhuyu Village
Gaoping Village
Sifang Village
Tai'an Village
Honghe Village
Lideng Village
Jinzhu Village
Hongtai Village
Yulong Village
Tuanbao Village
Huifeng Village

See also 
 List of township-level divisions of Chongqing

References 

Township-level divisions of Chongqing